Christian County is a county located in the U.S. state of Kentucky. As of the 2020 census, the population was 72,748. Its county seat is Hopkinsville. The county was formed in 1797. Christian County is part of the Clarksville, TN–KY Metropolitan Statistical Area.

History
The county is named for Colonel William Christian, a native of Augusta County, Virginia, and a veteran of the Revolutionary War. He settled near Louisville, Kentucky in 1785, and was killed by Native Americans in southern Indiana in 1786.

Jefferson Davis, president of the Confederate States of America, was born in Fairview, Christian County, Kentucky (now part of Todd County) in 1808. United States Vice President Adlai Stevenson I was born in Christian County in 1835.

The present courthouse, built in 1869, replaced a structure burned by Confederate cavalry in 1864 because the Union Army was using it as their barracks.

The United States Supreme Court case Barker v. Wingo, 407 U.S. 514 (1972), arose out of a 1958 double-murder in Christian County, Kentucky.

In 2006 and 2008, tornadoes touched down across northern Christian County, damaging homes in the Crofton area.

In 2017, northwestern Christian County was the point of greatest eclipse for the solar eclipse of August 21, 2017 that crossed North America. The center was in the Bainbridge/Sinking Fork area of the county, on the Orchardale farm.

Geography
It is the second-largest county by area in Kentucky and the largest in Western Kentucky.

Adjacent counties
 Hopkins County  (north)
 Muhlenberg County  (northeast)
 Todd County  (east)
 Montgomery County, Tennessee  (southeast)
 Stewart County, Tennessee  (southwest)
 Trigg County  (west)
 Caldwell County  (northwest)

Demographics

As of the census of 2000, there were 72,265 people, 24,857 households, and 18,344 families residing in the county. The racial makeup of the county was 69.92% White, 23.73% Black or African American, 0.52% Native American, 0.91% Asian, 0.32% Pacific Islander, 2.23% from other races, and 2.37% from two or more races. 4.83% of the population were Hispanic or Latino of any race.

There were 24,857 households, out of which 41.10% had children under the age of 18 living with them, 57.00% were married couples living together, 13.60% had a female householder with no husband present, and 26.20% were non-families. 22.50% of all households were made up of individuals, and 8.50% had someone living alone who was 65 years of age or older. The average household size was 2.66 and the average family size was 3.12.

In the county, the population was spread out, with 28.30% under the age of 18, 15.80% from 18 to 24, 30.10% from 25 to 44, 16.00% from 45 to 64, and 9.80% who were 65 years of age or older. The median age was 28 years. For every 100 females, there were 106.60 males. For every 100 females age 18 and over, there were 107.60 males.

The median income for a household in the county was $31,177, and the median income for a family was $35,240. Males had a median income of $25,063 versus $20,748 for females. The per capita income for the county was $14,611. About 12.10% of families and 15.00% of the population were below the poverty line, including 19.30% of those under age 18 and 13.50% of those age 65 or over.

Education
Most residents are zoned to Christian County Public Schools. However residents of Fort Campbell are zoned to Department of Defense Education Activity (DoDEA) schools.

High schools
 Christian County High School, established 1959
 Hopkinsville High School
 Fort Campbell High School — physically located in Tennessee, but serving the entire Fort Campbell base, and a member of Kentucky's governing body for high school athletics, the Kentucky High School Athletic Association
 University Heights Academy (private K-12)
 Heritage Christian Academy (private K-12)

Colleges
 Hopkinsville Community College
 Murray State University (regional campuses in Hopkinsville and Ft. Campbell)

Politics

Communities

Cities
 Crofton
 Hopkinsville
 LaFayette
 Oak Grove
 Pembroke

Census-designated places
 Fairview (partially in Todd County)
 Fort Campbell North

Other unincorporated communities

 Apex
 Bainbridge
 Bennettstown
 Bluff Spring
 Casky
 Edgoten
 Empire
 Fearsville
 Fruit Hill
 Garrettsburg
 Gracey
 Hensleytown
 Herndon
 Honey Grove
 Howel
 Julien
 Kelly
 Mannington
 Newstead
 Saint Elmo
 Sinking Fork

Notable people
Greg Buckner, former NBA player 
 Edgar Cayce (1877-1945), mystic 
Anthony Hickey (born 1992), basketball player for Hapoel Haifa in the Israeli Basketball Premier League
 Adlai Stevenson I, 23rd Vice President of the United States (1893-1897), was born in Christian County.
Whitney Westerfield, politician
Chris Whitney, former NBA player

See also

 National Register of Historic Places listings in Christian County, Kentucky

References

External links
 Community Data and Relocation Info
 Economic Development Council- Hopkinsville/Christian County
 Chamber of Commerce- Hopkinsville/Christian County
 WHVO-AM (Local Radio Station)
 History of Christian County
 

 
Kentucky counties
1797 establishments in Kentucky
Clarksville metropolitan area
Populated places established in 1797